Waigandshain is an Ortsgemeinde – a community belonging to a Verbandsgemeinde – in the Westerwaldkreis in Rhineland-Palatinate, Germany.

Geography

The community lies in the Westerwald between Siegen and Limburg. the Breitbach Reservoir lies within the municipal area. Waigandshain belongs to the Verbandsgemeinde of Rennerod, a kind of collective municipality. Its seat is in the like-named town.

History
In 1346, Waigandshain had its first documentary mention as Wiganshen.

Politics

The municipal council is made up of 6 council members who were elected in a majority vote in a municipal election on 13 June 2004.

Economy and infrastructure

Transport
Right near the community, Bundesstraßen 54 linking Limburg an der Lahn with Siegen, and 414 leading from Hohenroth to Hachenburg cross each other. The nearest Autobahn interchange is Haiger/Burbach on the A 45 (Dortmund–Aschaffenburg), some 16 km away. The nearest InterCityExpress stop is the railway station at Montabaur on the Cologne-Frankfurt high-speed rail line.

Established businesses
Fuhrländer AG manufactures windfarms.

References

External links
Waigandshain in the collective municipality’s Web pages 

Municipalities in Rhineland-Palatinate
Westerwaldkreis